Lolita Carbon is a Filipina singer and songwriter best known for her work with the band Asin and her influence in the Pinoy rock movement. She has been active as a composer and performer from 1970 to the present day who performs in Philippines as well as internationally. She is known for her songs "Masdan ang Kapaligiran", "Ang Buhay ko", "Pagbabalik", "Himig ng Pagibig" and "Usok".

Career

Carbon showed promise as a singer early in life. At age 10, she won a singing contest on the radio program Tina Betty's Children's Show with a performance of "The Impossible Dream". At age 13, she held a 6 month position as a singer with the Philippine Navy Band N2 Division and sang music by Shirley Bassey. Despite her father's wishes, Carbon decided to drop out of high school and pursue a career in music.

By 1976, Carbon had become an active musician who was booked to a full-time singing slot at a club called the Kola House. At that time, the Filipino popular music scene was undergoing a folk music revival associated with the Pinoy Rock movement. Filipino pop musicians were heavily influenced by Western performers such as Bob Dylan, Simon and Garfunkel, Joan Baez, and Peter, Paul, and Mary. While working at the Kola House, Carbon met fellow musicians Cesar Bañares Jr. and Mike Pillora Jr. and together with them, she would eventually form the ensemble known as Asin. One of the band's early successes came when they were signed by a record company and Carbon was tasked with singing a Japanese overdub of the hit song Anak, written by fellow filipino musician Freddie Aguilar.

While the band saw great success and popularity, Carbon and the other band members had extremely turbulent relationships. After alternating periods of collaboration and hiatus, Asin officially disbanded in 1990. In the time since, Carbon has contributed many musical collaborations. She was a part of the 'supergroup' Lokal Brown (best known for their hit "This Is Not Amerika") in 1990 and in 1991 formed her own band by the name of Nene. In 2012, she formed the band Tres Marias with fellow female musicians Cooky Chua and Bayang Barrios.

Personal life

Carbon was married twice and has four children.

Contributions
Through her work with Asin, Carbon has contributed to the representation of indigenous Filipino instruments in popular music. She is also notable as a female band leader who has been consistently performing with various outfits since the 1970s.

Collaborations
 One Way Up Band
 Asin
 Lolita and The Boys
 Sulabama
 Holy Smoke Band
 Lokal Brown
 NENE
 Tres Marias

Honors and awards
 Winner, singing contest on Tina Betty’s Children’s Show at age 10 for a performance of “The Impossible Dream”
 Best Folk Song of the Year for “Pagbabalik” - Aliw Awards 1978
 Best Rock Recording for "Paraisong Liku-liko" - AWIT Awards 1990
 Best Musical Arrangement for "Dalawang Dekada ng ASIN (Overture)" (a classical arrangement of all of ASIN's top hit songs) - AWIT Awards 2002

References

External links
 Official Website

20th-century Filipino women singers
Filipino singer-songwriters
1952 births
Singers from Manila
Living people